Youngsville is a town in Franklin County, North Carolina, United States.
The population was 2,016 at the 2020 census.

History
The settlement was originally established as Pacific around 1839 on land owned by John "Jack" Young. It was renamed Youngsville in his honor when the town was incorporated in 1875.

Notable area residents include country music singer Jason Michael Carroll.

William A. Jeffreys House was listed on the National Register of Historic Places in 1976.

Geography
Youngsville is located at  (36.025311, -78.477090), near Raleigh. According to the United States Census Bureau, the town has a total area of 1.6 square miles (4.1 km), all land.

A railway operated by CSX Transportation currently passes through Youngsville, which is part of the old Seaboard Coast Line Railroad "S-Line".

Demographics

2020 census

As of the 2020 United States census, there were 2,016 people, 809 households, and 529 families residing in the town.

2010 census
As of the census of 2010, there were 1,157 people, 522 households, and 294 families residing in the town. The population density was 723.1 people per square mile (282.2/km). The racial makeup of the town was 69.3% White, 25.1% African American, 0.3% Native American, 0.8% Asian, 0.0% Pacific Islander, 2.9% from other races, and 1.6% from two or more races. Hispanic or Latino of any race were 4.8% of the population.

There were 522 households, out of which 28.9% had children under the age of 18 living with them, 35.8% were married couples living together, 15.5% had a female householder with no husband present, and 43.7% were non-families. 35.1% of all households were made up of individuals, and 7.0% had someone living alone who was 65 years of age or older. The average household size was 2.22 and the average family size was 2.89.

In the town, the population was spread out, with 26.8% under the age of 20, 8.5% from 20 to 24, 31.8% from 25 to 44, 24.1% from 45 to 64, and 8.8% who were 65 years of age or older. The median age was 32.5 years. For every 100 females, there were 92.5 males. For every 100 females age 18 and over, there were 89.9 males.

The median income for a household in the town was $34,795, and the median income for a family was $43,250. Males had a median income of $32,500 versus $33,125 for females. The per capita income for the town was $21,927. About 8.2% of families and 9.3% of the population were below the poverty line, including 9.1% of those under age 18 and 2.9% of those age 65 or over.

Housing
There were 562 housing units at an average density of 351.3 per square mile (137.1/km). 7.1% of housing units were vacant.

There were 522 occupied housing units in the town. 203 were owner-occupied units (38.9%), while 319 were renter-occupied (61.1%). The homeowner vacancy rate was 7.7% of total units. The rental unit vacancy rate was 3.6%.

Government
Youngsville is governed by a mayor and five-member Board of Commissioners, who are elected in staggered four-year terms.

Mayor: Fonzie A. Flowers
Town Administrator: Nathan Page
Town Clerk: Emily Hurd
Commissioner: Joseph E. Johnson
Commissioner: Cat Redd
Commissioner: Scott Brame
Commissioner: Larry Wiggins
Commissioner: Corey Pursche

References

 William S. Powell, The North Carolina Gazetteer: A Dictionary of Tar Heel Places, 1968, The University of North Carolina Press at Chapel Hill, Library of Congress Catalog Card #28-25916, page 548. Retrieved Jan. 15, 2015.

External links
 Town of Youngsville (official website)
 Youngsville Area Business Association
 Youngsville Parks and Recreation Department
 Youngsville Fire Department
 Youngsville Academy Charter School

Towns in Franklin County, North Carolina
Towns in North Carolina
Populated places established in 1875
1875 establishments in North Carolina